This is a list of properties and districts in Echols County, Georgia that are listed on the National Register of Historic Places (NRHP).

Current listings

|}

References

Echols
Buildings and structures in Echols County, Georgia